Interstate 10 (I-10), a major east–west Interstate Highway in the southern areas of the United States, has a section of about  in Mississippi.

Route description
I-10 enters the Gulf Coast area of Mississippi from Louisiana after crossing the East Pearl River. The highway parallels US Route 90 (US 90) to the north as it runs through the southern parts of the three southernmost counties in the state: Hancock, Harrison, and Jackson.

As I-10 enters the Gulfport–Biloxi metropolitan area, its median widens shortly after crossing the Pearl River. The eastbound Mississippi Welcome Center is off the highway at exit 2 (Mississippi Highway 607, MS 607), and the eastbound truck weigh station can be found just west of exit 13 (MS 43/MS 603). Shortly after exit 13, I-10 crosses a bridge over the Jourdan River and enters Diamondhead, where the interstate serves as a buffer between the communities and the north shore of Bay of St. Louis while crossing the Hancock–Harrison county line at the same time. It widens from four to six lanes between the bridge over the Wolf River and exit 28 (Country Farm Road) northeast of Cuevas.

The highway passes through the northern section of Mississippi's second-largest city, Gulfport, and has a cloverleaf interchange with US 49 (exit 34) crossing a railway line, US 49 itself, and Bayou Bernard in the process, respectively. Additionally, the interchange is north of the flight plan for planes at Gulfport–Biloxi International Airport. The crossing of these two roads is officially recognized as the Castiglia Interchange.  later, I-10 intersects MS 605 (Lorraine Road), which provides access to Gulfport's eastern neighborhoods and crosses the Biloxi River. A short distance later, the road crosses the Tchoutacabouffa River before entering the northern sections of Biloxi. After two diamond interchanges, collective–distributor roads can be found on both sides at exits 46A–D. The eastbound exits here are for D'Iberville Boulevard (exit 46A), I-110 (southbound exit 46B), as well as northbound MS 15 and MS 67. The westbound exits are for Lamey Bridge Road (exit 46D), northbound MS 15/MS 67 (exit 46C), and southbound I-110 (exit 46B). Shortly after the semi-complex interchange, the route crosses the Harrison–Jackson county line.

No other interchanges exist within Jackson County until over  later at MS 609 (exit 50), and the road narrows back down to four lanes east of MS 57 (exit 57) north of Ocean Springs. One last interchange can be found in Gautier west of a pair of rest areas on both sides of the road. A connecting U-turn for official and emergency vehicles links both rest areas with one another. Immediately after the rest areas, I-10 uses a long causeway to cross the West Pascagoula River, several unnamed creeks and rivers, wetlands, and swamps, before crossing the main channel.

East of the Pascagoula wetlands, the road enters the northern section of Moss Point. Two interchanges with MS 613 and MS 63 provide access to the city of Pascagoula and are in close proximity to one another before I-10 starts to head northeastward. Following a shorter causeway over the Escatawpa River and its wetlands, I-10 has one last eastbound truck weigh station across the road from the westbound Mississippi Welcome Center, followed by one last interchange, for Franklin Creek Road (exit 75). The first westbound truck weigh station can be spotted across the road before I-10 finally enters Alabama after trekking  in the Magnolia State.

History

I-10 was built in 1982 throughout Mississippi. It was originally completed in Alabama and Louisiana before Mississippi completed its portion. I-10 in Alabama routed onto US 90 at the state line, which was the default roadway across southern Mississippi before I-10 was completed. Today, US 90 is not directly accessible from I-10. When coming from Louisiana, I-10 ended at MS 607 (exit 2). Today, entering Mississippi from Louisiana, the first  is the NASA John C. Stennis Space Center easement zone. To this day, I-10 displays the control city of Bay St. Louis from traveling from New Orleans, Louisiana; and Pascagoula from traveling from Mobile, Alabama.

Exit list

Auxiliary routes
I-110 is a spur into Biloxi

References

External links

Interstate 10 - Mississippi (AARoads.com)

10
 Mississippi
Transportation in Hancock County, Mississippi
Transportation in Harrison County, Mississippi
Transportation in Jackson County, Mississippi